Greencoat Renewables PLC is an Irish investment company investing in primarily Irish and Euro denominated European wind farms and renewable energy infrastructure. Established in 2017, its primary listing is on the Irish Stock Exchange, where it is a constituent of the ISEQ 20 stock market index. Greencoat Capital LLP acts as investment manager to Greencoat Renewables PLC and its sister company Greencoat UK Wind.

The company had a market capitalisation of €747.3m as at 31 December 2019 and produced 1,154GWh from its 15 Irish wind farms in the year to 31 December.

In October 2020 the group revealed that purchase of the An Cnoc wind farm in Co Tipperary, Ireland had been completed.  Later in November 2020 the group announced a placing of new shares aimed at raising approximately €100m for the company.

In May 2022, it was announced Greencoat had acquired four onshore wind farms in France from the Swiss energy company, Axpo.

References

External links
 

Irish companies established in 2017
Companies listed on Euronext Dublin
Companies based in Dublin (city)